"What You Get Is What You See" is a song by recording artist Tina Turner from her album Break Every Rule (1986). The 12" single included three versions of the song, the Extended Dance Mix, the Extended Rock Mix and a live version recorded in London in November 1986. A different live recording of the song was later used as the opening track on Turner's 1988 album Tina Live in Europe. She also included it in her 2009 live album Tina Live. It was recorded during Turner's hugely successful 50th Anniversary Tour. The track is from the March 21, 2009 live show at the GelreDome in Arnhem, Netherlands.

The music video for the song was directed by Peter Care.

Background
The song was written by the Terry Britten and Graham Lyle team and was notably different from the three previous singles that they had written for Turner, "What's Love Got to Do with It", "We Don't Need Another Hero" and "Two People", as it was an up-tempo country-tinged rock track. The song was originally to feature a guitar solo by Eric Clapton, but Clapton's contribution was accidentally recorded an octave too low; Terry Britten ultimately played the guitar solo himself. Tina Turner said in an interview that "What You Get Is What You See" is her favorite song from the album.

Versions and remixes
 Single edit – 3:57
 Album version – 4:31
 Extended Dance Mix – 6:28
 Extended Rock Mix – 5:56

Personnel 
 Tina Turner – lead vocals 
 Nick Glennie-Smith – keyboards 
 Terry Britten – programming, guitars, bass
 Graham Lyle – mandolin

Charts

Weekly charts

Year-end charts

Covers
The song has been covered many times including by Canadian country music group Straight Clean & Simple and a single for the band taken from their 1992 album Iron Lady. It was also covered by Scottish / Irish country artist Lisa McHugh. Her cover appears in her 2014 album A Life That's Good.

In popular culture
"What You Get Is What You See" was popular in Australia, where in 1989 it was used in a campaign for the New South Wales Rugby League. They later used the Tina Turner song "The Best" in another campaign.

See also
WYGIWYS, a variant of WYSIWYG (See WYSIWYG#Variations)

References 

1987 singles
Tina Turner songs
Songs written by Graham Lyle
Songs written by Terry Britten
1986 songs
Capitol Records singles
Country rock songs